Raymond Ofula is a Kenyan actor. He has been in the film industry for over 40 years. and he has featured in both local and international films.

Career 
He has appeared in such films as To Walk with Lions (1999), Lara Croft: Tomb Raider – The Cradle of Life (2003), The White Masai (2005), Winterreise (2006) and The Boy Who Harnessed the Wind (2019).  He has also appeared in the Netflix show Queen Sono. Raymond is also a talent Judge helping shape upcoming talented actors together with other seasoned actors like Naomi Nga'nga in an acting reality  tv show by Startimes Kenya dubbed as the next superstar
Ofula was married to Anne Ofula until her death in 2008.

References

External links
 

Living people
Kenyan male film actors
Kenyan male television actors
21st-century Kenyan male actors
20th-century Kenyan male actors
Year of birth missing (living people)